Yang Hee-eun (born August 13, 1952) is a South Korean singer and songwriter. Her syndicated radio show Women Era has aired via the MBC Standard FM since 1999.

Awards and honors

References

External links

 

1959 births
Living people
South Korean folk rock singers
South Korean women pop singers
South Korean radio presenters
Sogang University alumni
Musicians from Seoul
Cheongju Yang clan
20th-century South Korean women singers
21st-century South Korean women singers
South Korean women radio presenters
South Korean women singer-songwriters
Recipients of the Order of Cultural Merit (Korea)